Gordon Coutts was born in Glasgow/Aberdeen, Scotland on Oct. 3, 1868. He began his art studies at the Glasgow School of Art before venturing south to study in London at the Royal Academy. He continued his studies at the Académie Julian, Paris, under Lefebvre, Fleury, and Rossi, and also at the National Gallery School, Melbourne from 1891 to 1893. He met Tom Roberts there, whose influence is reflected in the portrait "Waiting" shown here, of a young woman seated in the waiting room of a wayside station in the bush. The model, in fact, posed inside a studio, with the background painted around her afterwards.
This popular painting is the artist's most esteemed Australian work. The femininity of the sitter and her fashionable attire were trademarks of portrait and genre styles at the time. this portrait is at the Art Gallery of New South Wales.
He won first prizes for "Painting Head from Life" in 1892 and 1893 and received an Honourable Mention for his Travelling Scholarship entry. In 1896 he moved to Sydney where he taught at the Art Society of New South Wales until 1899 when he returned to Europe. From 1890 to 1902 he was a regular exhibitor at the Victorian Artists' Society in Melbourne, and the Royal Art Society in Sydney.
In Europe Coutts met the English artist, Alice Grey whom he married. In 1902 they moved to San Francisco where he became a member and frequent exhibitor at the Bohemian Club, while maintaining a home across the bay in Piedmont. Always an inveterate traveller he spent time in Paris, Spain and Tangier, where he had a studio for many years. He received a gold medal at the Alaska Yukon Pacific Exposition in 1909 and at the Paris Salon in 1913. Over the years he exhibited regularly at the Royal Academy, the Paris salons and many American International Exhibitions.
Suffering from tuberculosis he moved to Palm Springs in 1924. He built a Moroccan style villa to recreate a favourite place in Tangier. Dar Marroc is still a well known local landmark and is now part of the Korakia boutique hotel. Winston Churchill and Sir John Lavery were among the many celebrities to visit Dar Marroc.  Gordon Coutts died in Palm Springs on February. 21, 1937.

References

1868 births
1937 deaths
American male painters
Artists from Palm Springs, California
Painters from California
20th-century American painters
20th-century American male artists